Stuartina is a genus of small annual herbs in the tribe Gnaphalieae within the family Asteraceae, native to Australia.

 Species
 Stuartina hamata Philipson - hooked cudweed or prickly cudweed, native to South Australia, Victoria, New South Wales and Queensland.
 Stuartina muelleri Sond. - spoon cudweed, native to Western Australia, South Australia, Victoria

References

Asteraceae genera
Gnaphalieae
Asterales of Australia
Taxa named by Otto Wilhelm Sonder